The Valley Stream Stakes was a flat horse race for Thoroughbred two-year-old fillies. It was raced over a distance of 6 furlongs on dirt at Aqueduct Racetrack in Jamaica, New York.

The race was discontinued after the 2005 running.

Winners 

Recurring sporting events established in 2001
Discontinued horse races in New York City
Aqueduct Racetrack
Flat horse races for two-year-old fillies
Previously graded stakes races in the United States
Recurring sporting events disestablished in 2005
2001 establishments in New York City
2005 disestablishments in New York (state)